Andreas Ehrig (born 20 October 1959 in Langenbernsdorf) is a former speed skater from East Germany. Ehrig took part twice in the Winter Olympics in 1980 and 1984, where he ended five times in the top ten and once finished eleventh.

Personal records

Resultats

- = no participationNC# = not qualified for the final distance, but as # listed in the final ranking(#, #, #, #) = distance position on all-round tournament (500m, 5000m, 1500m, 10000m) or on junior tournament (500m, 1500m, 1000m, 3000m).''

Medal table

References
  Andreas Ehrig on SpeedSkatingNews.info
 Andreas Ehrig on Sports-Reference.com
 Andreas Ehrig on SpeedSkatingStats.com
  Andreas Ehrig on Sportuitslagen.org
 PB's of Ehrig on Jakub Majerski's Speedskating Database

Living people
1959 births
Speed skaters at the 1980 Winter Olympics
Speed skaters at the 1984 Winter Olympics
German male speed skaters
Olympic speed skaters of East Germany
World Allround Speed Skating Championships medalists